"Dead Or Alive" is the 23rd single by Japanese boy band KAT-TUN, released in Japan on January 21, 2015, on the J-One Records label.  It is their first single in eight months, since the release of "In Fact". The title track "Dead Or Alive" the main theme song for the film Joker Game starring member Kamenashi Kazuya, released on January 31, 2015. In addition, the single will include a Kamenashi Kazuya solo song and music video, the last member to release his solo promotional video in conjunction with the group's single releases. Titled "Hanasanaide Ai", his upcoming track is written and composed by Kinki Kids’ Domoto Tsuyoshi.

Single information
"Dead or Alive" is the twenty-third single release from KAT-TUN, released approximately eight months after their previous single In Fact. The release comes in three versions - Regular Edition, Limited Edition 1, and Limited Edition 2. All versions of the album include "Dead or Alive". The Regular Edition contains six track, with "White Lovers", "You are Delicious!" and original karaoke included. The Limited Edition 1 contains four tracks, with "Polaris", original karaoke included and comes with a bonus DVD with the title song and its making-of. The Limited Edition 2 includes "Hanasanaide Ai" on CD, comes with a bonus DVD with a music video for the solo song of Kamenashi Kazuya.

Lyrics, music and arrangement of "Dead or Alive" is by Jovette Rivera and Maiko Kawabe Rivera, the couple who are also responsible for KAT-TUN's past album highlights (Phoenix, Moon, 1582, Taboo, Water Dance). The song is described as a hard tune which depicts the paper-thin extremity between life and death as geniuses put their intelligence to the test for this dramatically impactful and large-scale game. This work shows how KAT-TUN continues to dig even deeper as they mature. On the other hand, Kamenashi is emotional, expressing a “love that doesn’t let go”, in a lot of ways, in his solo video for "Hanasaide Ai", a song written and composed by Kinki Kids’ Domoto Tsyuyoshi. The song was written in 2002 and was his very first solo song.

Promotion
On December 27, 2014,  KAT-TUN performed "Dead Or Alive" for the first time, on the music variety program Samaazu no Utafuri! aired on NTV in Japan.

Track listing

Chart performance
"Dead or Alive" debuted at the number one spot on the Oricon weekly single chart, selling over 191,505 copies in its first week of release. This was the 23rd consecutive number-one single for KAT-TUN, putting them in second place behind Kinki Kids with 34 consecutive number-one singles since debuting. KAT-TUN topped the Oricon Monthly Chart for January 2015 with 199,598 copies sold. The single has sold 205,500 copies so far.

References

External links
 Dead Or Alive product information

KAT-TUN songs
2015 songs
2015 singles
Japanese television drama theme songs
Oricon Weekly number-one singles
Billboard Japan Hot 100 number-one singles